The Nandi Award for Best Actress was commissioned in 1977. The winner is awarded a "Silver Nandi" and a cash award of 30,000.

Most Awards were received by Vijayashanti and Jayasudha (4 awards each).

List of winners of Nandi Awards for Best Actress

References

See also
 Nandi Awards
 Cinema of Andhra Pradesh

Actress
Film awards for lead actress